Woodburn Rugby Stadium

References

Soccer venues in South Africa
Sports venues in KwaZulu-Natal